Little Jacks Creek may refer to:
Little Jacks Creek, New South Wales, a locality in Australia
Little Jacks Creek (Idaho), a tributary of Jacks Creek (Bruneau River)